Democracy Party may refer to:

 Democracy Party (Turkey), a pro-Kurdish party in Turkey
 Democracy Party (Iran) (Hezb-e-Mardomsalari), a pro-reforms party in Iran
 Democracy Party of China

See also
Democracy (disambiguation)
 Democratic Party (disambiguation)
Democrat Party (disambiguation)